This article shows all participating team squads at the 2001 Women's European Water Polo Championship.

















References

Women
Women's European Water Polo Championship
European Water Polo Championship squads